Aditya Singh Rana (born 28 June 1991) is an Indian male artistic gymnast, representing his nation at international competitions. He competed at world championships, including the 2009 World Artistic Gymnastics Championships in London, United Kingdom.

References

External links 
 

1991 births
Living people
Indian male artistic gymnasts
Place of birth missing (living people)
Gymnasts at the 2014 Commonwealth Games
Gymnasts at the 2014 Asian Games
Asian Games competitors for India
Commonwealth Games competitors for India